Manzoor Ahmad Mengal (born 1973), is a Pakistani Sunni Muslim scholar and a supporter of Jamiat Ulema-e Islam (F).

Education and career 
Mengal received his early education from a government school.  Then in 1973 he joined the madrassa in his village.  After completing the Quran, he traveled to Tando Muhammad Khan in 1979 and enrolled in Darul Uloom Muhammadiya Madrasa.  He later enrolled at Jamia Farooqia. Then he remained associated with the field of hadith.  He served as Imam at Jamia Farooqia for 28 years.  During this period, he recited the Quran 28 times during the obligatory prayers. He completed his PhD in 1992 from University of Sindh in a short time (two months) under the supervision of Nizamuddin Shamzai.  He memorized Sahih Bukhari in Saudi Arabia in just a month and a half.  He speaks in different languages like Balochi, Brahui, Pashto, Urdu, Arabic and Persian.

Controversy 
In 2021, following the annual Aurat March on International Women's Day, Mengal repeated allegations of blasphemy propagated by anti-feminist elements in Pakistan.

Books
 Tuhfatul Manazir

See also
Muhammad Ilyas Ghuman

References

1962 births
Deobandis
University of Sindh alumni
People from Khuzdar District
Living people